Liudemuhls or Ljudemisl was a medieval Slavic duke, vassal to the Franks, who was in power in 823 in parts of Dalmatia known as the Duchy of the Croats.

Ljudemisl was the maternal uncle of Borna, the Duke of Dalmatia (r. 819–821). After Ljudevit had left the Serbs, he was a guest of Ljudemisl, who treacherously killed him. Ljudemisl may have done so to fortify his claim to power under the Franks.

References

Sources 
 
 
 

9th-century Slavs
9th-century people from East Francia
History of Dalmatia
Year of birth unknown
9th-century deaths
9th-century Croatian people
Slavic warriors
Dukes of Croatia